Robert Shirley, 6th Earl Ferrers (20 July 1723 – 18 April 1787) was a British nobleman.

He was born in 1723 in St James, Westminster, the third son of Laurence Shirley.

On 26 December 1754, he married Catherine Cotton (d. 26 March 1786), by whom he had three children:
Robert Shirley, 7th Earl Ferrers (1756–1824)
Lawrence Rowland Ferrers (1757 – 5 February 1773), who appears as a youth in Joseph Wright's painting, "A Philosopher Lecturing on the Orrery"
Washington Shirley, 8th Earl Ferrers (1760–1842)

In 1778, he succeeded his brother, Vice-Admiral the 5th Earl Ferrers, in the earldom. On 4 July 1781, he was created a deputy lieutenant of Derbyshire. He died in his house in London in 1787 aged 63, and was buried with his wife at Breedon on the Hill.

References

1723 births
1787 deaths
Deputy Lieutenants of Derbyshire
06